is a Japanese fantasy manga series written and illustrated by Nakaba Suzuki. It was serialized in Kodansha's Weekly Shōnen Magazine from October 2012 to March 2020, with the chapters collected into 41 tankōbon volumes. Featuring a setting similar to the European Middle Ages, the story follows a titular group of knights representing the seven deadly sins. The manga has been licensed by Kodansha USA for English publication in North America, while the chapters were released digitally by Crunchyroll in over 170 countries as they were published in Japan.

A-1 Pictures adapted the series into a three-season anime television series that ran from October 2014 to June 2018, and one theatrical film: Prisoners of the Sky. Studio Deen produced two further seasons that ran from October 2019 to June 2021, and a second theatrical film: Cursed by Light. Funimation licensed the home video rights to the first season. Finally, Netflix acquired the exclusive English streaming rights to the anime, while releasing the third (two-part) anime film: Grudge of Edinburgh during 20222023.

In 2015, The Seven Deadly Sins won the 39th Kodansha Manga Award for the shōnen category. As of November 2022, the manga had over 38 million copies in circulation, making it one of the best-selling manga series.

Premise

Liones' third princess, Elizabeth Liones, finds the Seven Deadly Sins' leader-Meliodas, before they search out his comrades so they can clear their names and liberate Liones from the Holy Knights, who were manipulated by a demon named Fraudrin into unsealing the Demon Race from their prison.

Production
The Seven Deadly Sins began as a one-shot that was published in Kodansha's Weekly Shōnen Magazine on November 22, 2011. Nakaba Suzuki drew more than twenty versions of the pilot chapter. One of these manuscripts, "Chapter X", was released in English on Kodansha USA's website in 2015. For the series, Suzuki borrowed the names of characters from tales about King Arthur, but used his original ideas for their personalities and the story itself. The relationship between Meliodas and Elizabeth was decided on from the beginning, but the author thought up everything else weekly as he went in order to keep it unpredictable. In order to surprise readers, he purposely made the appearances of some of the titular group of knights very different from their wanted posters that appear in the first chapter and had others look the same as their poster, but gave them "horrible" personalities. Although it was decided to make the protagonist of the series a "child", Suzuki struggled with designing Meliodas' profile because the character is actually an adult. He said the most difficult part was his hair; ultimately deciding on "fluffy" hair like a boy from a foreign country, which he had never done before. In the pilot chapter, the character had long, straight hair, which the author said was not as cute. Suzuki said he always made sure to show the subtly different relationships between the members of the titular group of knights. For example, he said that while Ban is Meliodas' best friend, King is only a teammate with whom he does not talk. All seven have such relationships, which the author called realistically human.

Publication

Main series

Written and illustrated by Nakaba Suzuki, The Seven Deadly Sins was serialized in Kodansha's Weekly Shōnen Magazine from October 10, 2012, to March 25, 2020. Kodansha collected its chapters into 41 individual tankōbon volumes, released from February 15, 2013, to May 15, 2020. Suzuki created the three-chapter  manga that was included in limited editions of the anime adaptation's first three home video sets in 2015. A book compiling the Vampire of Edinburgh and  side stories, and the pilot one-shot was published on July 17, 2018 under the title . Suzuki mentioned that he had plans for additional side stories that would be published after the main series finished. , a one-shot following Ban's son, was published in Weekly Shōnen Magazine on August 5, 2020. In January 2021, Suzuki began Four Knights of the Apocalypse as a sequel to The Seven Deadly Sins.

In 2013, The Seven Deadly Sins was licensed for English language release in North America by Kodansha USA. They published the first volume on March 11, 2014, and the 41st and final volume on January 26, 2021. As the manga was serialized in Japan, it was released simultaneously in English digitally by Crunchyroll in over 170 countries. Kodansha USA published the Original Sins book on October 26, 2021, and began re-releasing The Seven Deadly Sins in an omnibus format that compiles three of the original volumes into one on February 1, 2022.

Spin-offs

A special issue of Weekly Shōnen Magazine, published on October 19, 2013, featured a small crossover between Suzuki's The Seven Deadly Sins and Hiro Mashima's Fairy Tail, where each artist drew a yonkoma (four-panel comic) of the other's series. An actual crossover chapter between the two ran in the magazine's combined 4/5 issue of 2014, which was released on December 25, 2013. Suzuki wrote a one-shot for the November 2014 issue of the shōjo manga magazine Nakayoshi, released on October 3, 2014. He also created a comedic one-shot depicting how Meliodas and Hawk first met that ran in the October 20, 2014 issue of Magazine Special. From February 24 to May 10, 2015, two more spin-off manga by Nakaba were available on the smartphone and tablet application Manga Box.  is about Hendrickson and Dreyfus' younger years, while  is set after the Vaizel Fight Festival arc and follows Gilthunder. Suzuki created an original 40-page manga that was distributed during screenings of the Prisoners of the Sky film.

A comedic spin-off series by Juichi Yamaki, titled  and imagining the characters as high school students, ran in Bessatsu Shōnen Magazine from August 9, 2014, to October 8, 2016. It was collected into four tankōbon volumes. , a comedic spin-off by Chiemi Sakamoto that imagines the characters as actors performing in a live-action TV show, ran in Aria from November 28, 2015, to October 28, 2017. It was collected into four tankōbon volumes.

A comedic yonkoma titled  and written by Masataka Ono that depicts King as an aspiring manga artist, began on February 20, 2016, in Magazine Special before transferring to the Manga Box app on February 1, 2017, and ending later that year. Its chapters were collected into three tankōbon volumes. Yō Kokukuji's The Seven Deadly Sins: Seven Days ~The Thief and the Holy Girl~, a manga adaptation of Mamoru Iwasa's novel The Seven Deadly Sins: Seven Days, was serialized in Shōnen Magazine Edge from January 17 to September 2017 and shows how Ban and Elaine met in more detail.

Media

Anime

In April 2014, the 20th issue of Weekly Shōnen Magazine announced that The Seven Deadly Sins was being adapted into an anime television series. The series aired on MBS, TBS and other JNN stations from October 5, 2014, to March 29, 2015. The staff was revealed in the combined 36/37 issue of the year: created by A-1 Pictures, directed by Tensai Okamura, written by Shōtarō Suga, with Keigo Sasaki  providing character designs, and Hiroyuki Sawano composing the music. The show's first opening theme song is  performed by Ikimono-gakari for the first twelve episodes and the second opening theme is "Seven Deadly Sins" performed by Man with a Mission, while the first ending theme titled "7-Seven" is a collaboration between Flow and Granrodeo, the second ending theme from episode thirteen onwards is "Season" the major label debut of Alisa Takigawa.

A second anime series was confirmed on September 27, 2015, to air in 2016. This turned out to be a four-week anime television special featuring an original story by Nakaba Suzuki, titled , that aired from August 28 to September 18, 2016, on MBS and TBS. The special was produced by A-1 Pictures, directed by Tomokazu Tokoro, and written by Yuniko Ayana and Yuichiro Kido, featuring character designs by Keigo Sasaki. The music was composed by Hiroyuki Sawano and Takafumi Wada. A commercial following the final episode confirmed a second anime series has been green-lit.

The first Seven Deadly Sins anime series was licensed for English release by Netflix as its second exclusive anime, following their acquisition of Knights of Sidonia. All 24 episodes were released on November 1, 2015, in both subtitled or English dub formats. The Signs of Holy War arc, labeled as "Season 2", has also been licensed by Netflix and was released on February 17, 2017. On February 14, 2017, Funimation announced that they acquired the first anime for home video distribution for US and Canada and released the series on Blu-ray and DVD later in the year. Part One of the first season was released on Blu-Ray on May 15, 2017, with Part Two being released June 20 the same year. The complete entirety of the first season was released on August 14, 2018. Madman Entertainment is importing Funimation's release into Australia and New Zealand, with a release scheduled for January 2019.

A third season, titled , was announced at the "Nanatsu no Taizai FES" event in July 2017 and aired from January 13 to June 30, 2018. Jōji Furuta and Takao Yoshioka replaced Tensai Okamura and Shōtarō Suga as director and series composer, respectively, while the other main staff members returned from the first season to reprise their roles. The Revival of the Commandments arc, labeled as "Season 3", was released on October 15, 2018, on Netflix.  The first opening theme song of the series titled "Howling" is a collaboration between Flow and Granrodeo, and first ending theme song is "Beautiful" performed by Any. The second opening theme titled "Ame ga Furu kara, Niji ga Deru" (雨が降るから虹が出る) by Sky Peace and second ending theme titled "Chikai" (誓い) by Sora Amamiya.

A fourth season, titled  aired from October 9, 2019, to March 25, 2020, on TV Tokyo and BS TV Tokyo. The third season is animated by Studio Deen with Susumu Nishizawa and Rintarō Ikeda replacing Jōji Furuta and Takao Yoshioka as director and series composer, respectively. Hiroyuki Sawano, Kohta Yamamoto, and Takafumi Wada are returning to reprise their roles as the music composers. The first opening theme song is "Rob the Frontier" by Uverworld, and the first ending theme song is "Regeneration" by Sora Amamiya. The second opening theme song is "Delete" by Sid and the second ending theme is "Good day" by Kana Adachi.

A fifth season, titled  was slated to premiere in October 2020 on TV Tokyo and BS TV Tokyo, with the main cast members reprising their roles. However, it was delayed to January 2021, due to the COVID-19 pandemic. A special program that celebrated the "charm" of the anime TV series was released on January 6, 2021, while the fourth season aired from January 13 to June 23, 2021. The main staff and cast members, from the previous season, reprised their roles. The second opening theme is  performed by Sora Amamiya, while the second ending theme is "Namely" by Uverworld. The first twelve episodes of the Dragon's Judgement arc, labeled as "Season 5" on Netflix, was released on June 28, 2021, on the streaming service. Episodes 13-24 were released globally on September 23, 2021.

Original video animation
An original video animation (OVA) titled  was included with the limited edition of volume 15 of the manga, released on June 17, 2015. A second OVA composed of nine humorous shorts was shipped with the limited edition of the sixteenth volume of the manga, released on August 12, 2015.

Light novels
Vertical released Seven Scars They Left Behind in North America in May 2017, with Seven-Colored Recollections following in March 2018.

Films
An anime film, titled The Seven Deadly Sins the Movie: Prisoners of the Sky, premiered in Japanese theaters on August 18, 2018. Directed by Yasuto Nishikata, with Noriyuki Abe serving as chief director, it was written by Makoto Uezu and based on an original story by Nakaba Suzuki. The other main staff members returned from the anime series to reprise their roles on the film.

A second anime film titled The Seven Deadly Sins: Cursed by Light premiered on July 2, 2021. Takayuki Hamana directed the film at Studio Deen, with Rintarō Ikeda writing the film's script.

A two-part anime film, titled The Seven Deadly Sins: Grudge of Edinburgh, was announced during Netflix's "Festival Japan" virtual event in November 2021. The film revolves around Meliodas' son, Tristan Liones. Bob Shirahata serves as director, with Noriyuki Abe as supervising director, and Rintarou Ikeda as scriptwriter. It is animated by Alfred Imageworks and Marvy Jack. The first part of the film was released on Netflix on December 20, 2022, with the second part set for a August 2023 release.

Video games
A video game titled  was developed by Bandai Namco Entertainment and released for the Nintendo 3DS on February 11, 2015. A game titled  was developed by Bandai Namco for the PlayStation 4. It was released in North America and Europe on February 9, 2018. A mobile game titled  was developed by Netmarble and released in Japan and Korea on June 4, 2019. On March 3, 2020, the game was released globally for Android and iOS. The series will also be part of the King of Fighters game as of March 30 in collaboration with Netmarbles's franchise. In January 2022, Netmarble announced an open-world game titled The Seven Deadly Sins: Origin. It will be released for Microsoft Windows via Steam, iOS, Android, and consoles.

Other media
An illustration collection titled  and an official fan book were both released on February 17, 2015. A guidebook for the anime titled  was released on April 17, 2015, while a second fan book was published on August 17, 2016. Three character guidebooks each focusing on a different couple from The Seven Deadly Sins have been released; Meliodas and Elizabeth on October 17, 2016, Ban and Elaine on July 14, 2017, and King and Diane on November 16, 2018. A book where Suzuki discusses the completed series and its creation in depth was released on May 15, 2020, while a character directory profiling over 200 characters from the manga was published on May 17, 2021.

A stage play adaptation, The Seven Deadly Sins The Stage, was performed in August 2018. A second stage play,  was announced to be performed in June 2020, but was cancelled due to the COVID-19 pandemic.

Reception

Manga
The Seven Deadly Sins was named Best Shōnen Manga at the 39th Kodansha Manga Awards alongside Yowamushi Pedal. The 2014 edition of Takarajimasha's Kono Manga ga Sugoi! list, which surveys people in the manga and publishing industry, named The Seven Deadly Sins the fifth best manga series for male readers. It was also nominated for the 2014 Manga Taishō award and as Best Youth Comic at the 42nd Angoulême International Comics Festival in France.

Rebecca Silverman of Anime News Network gave the first volume a B grade, calling the art interesting and the story a "neat take on the basic knights-in-shining-armor." She saw influence from Akira Toriyama in Meliodas and 1970s shōjo manga in the female characters. However, Silverman felt the art had issues with perspective and commented that Elizabeth lacked character development. Both Silverman and Danica Davidson of Otaku USA warned that Meliodas' perverted actions towards Elizabeth, which are used for comedic relief, could possibly be misinterpreted by some readers.

By August 2014, the collected volumes of The Seven Deadly Sins had 5 million copies in circulation. By January 2015, this number had grown to 10 million sold. By June 2018, the series had 28 million copies in circulation; over 37 million copies in circulation by March 2020; and over 38 million copies in circulation by November 2022. The first collected volume of the series sold 38,581 copies in its first week, ranking number 13 on the Oricon manga chart. Its second volume ranked 5 selling 106,829 in its first week, while its third debuted at number 4 with 135,164 copies. The thirteenth volume had the manga's best debut week to date, selling 442,492 for first place on the chart. The series was the ninth best-selling manga of 2014, with over 4.6 million copies sold that year. For the first half of 2015, The Seven Deadly Sins was the number one best-selling series. It finished the year in second place with over 10.3 million copies sold, behind only One Piece. It was the sixth best-selling of 2016, with over 5 million copies sold, and the seventh of 2017, with close to 3.6 million copies sold. With 32,762 copies sold of the five volumes released at the time, The Seven Deadly Sins was the 30th best-selling anime of the first half of 2015. The novel The Seven Deadly Sins -Gaiden- Sekijitsu no Ōto Nanatsu no Negai was the 33rd best-selling light novel of the first half of 2015, with 61,939 copies sold. The North American releases of volumes two and four charted on The New York Times Manga Best Seller list at number seven and nine respectively.

Anime
Reviewing the first anime for Anime News Network, Theron Martin felt that the series has a slow start with typical action fare but the storytelling picks up significantly in the second half. He had strong praise for the music and enjoyed the main cast and their interactions, but not the common archetypal villains. Martin noted that the art has a "semi-cartoonish look" that one would expect in a series that "skews a bit younger," but The Seven Deadly Sins graphic violence and minimal fan service prove it's "anything but a kiddie show."

In October 2017, Netflix revealed that The Seven Deadly Sins anime was the fourth most binge-watched show within its first 24 hours of release on their platform. The first DVD volume of the anime debuted at number one on Oricon's Japanese animation DVD chart with 3,574 copies sold.

Notes

References

External links
 Official page at Weekly Shōnen Magazine
 Official anime website
 Official video game website
 

The Seven Deadly Sins
2014 anime television series debuts
2016 anime television series debuts
2018 anime television series debuts
2019 anime television series debuts
2021 anime television series debuts
A-1 Pictures
Adventure anime and manga
Anime OVAs composed by Hiroyuki Sawano
Anime composed by Hiroyuki Sawano
Aniplex
Arthurian comics
Demons in anime and manga
Fantasy anime and manga
Fiction about size change
Funimation
Kodansha manga
Mainichi Broadcasting System original programming
Netflix original anime
Seven deadly sins in popular culture
Shōnen manga
Studio Deen
Television series based on Arthurian legend
TV Tokyo original programming
Vertical (publisher) titles
Winner of Kodansha Manga Award (Shōnen)